Rhinogobio hunanensis is a species of cyprinid fish. It is endemic to the middle and upper reaches of the Yuan River in China.

It can grow to  standard length.

References

hunanensis
Cyprinid fish of Asia
Freshwater fish of China
Endemic fauna of China
Fish described in 1980